30 by Ella is a 1968 studio album by the American jazz singer Ella Fitzgerald.

The album's unusual construction of six medleys of songs were arranged by Benny Carter. This album was Fitzgerald's final recording made for Capitol Records. The following album release on Capitol from Fitzgerald, Misty Blue had been recorded in late 1967.

Track listing

For the 1968 LP on Capitol Records; Capitol ST 2960; Re-issued in 2000 on CD, Capitol 7243 5 20090 2 2

Personnel
 Ella Fitzgerald – vocals
 Jimmy Jones – piano
 Harry "Sweets" Edison – trumpet
 Georgie Auld – tenor saxophone
 John Collins – guitar
 Panama Francis – drums (tracks 3 & 6)
 Louie Bellson  - drums (tracks 1, 2, 4, 5 & 7)
 Bob West – bass

References

1968 albums
Capitol Records albums
Ella Fitzgerald albums
Albums arranged by Benny Carter